John Maddox may refer to:

John Maddox (1925–2009), British scientist
John Maddox (cricketer) (born 1930), Australian former cricketer
John Maddox (politician), American politician
Johnny Maddox (1927–2018), American ragtime pianist
John Medex Maddox (1789–1861), British playwright and theatre manager
John W. Maddox (1848–1922), U.S. Representative from Georgia